BBC Radio Berkshire is the BBC's local radio station serving the county of Berkshire.

It broadcasts on FM, DAB, digital TV and via BBC Sounds studios at Thames Valley Park near Reading.

According to RAJAR, the station has a weekly audience of 118,000 listeners and a 4.4% share as of December 2022.

History
The station began on 21 January 1992, initially as a sister station of Radio Oxford, broadcasting for part of the weekday and weekend mornings. Due to financial cutbacks, BBC Director-General John Birt announced that it was to merge with BBC Radio Oxford on 9 April 1996 to become BBC Thames Valley FM. On 14 February 2000, the two stations became separate once again.

Awards
The Andrew Peach Show was named Best Local Radio Show in the UK at the 2021 Radio Academy ARIA Awards.
 
BBC Radio Berkshire was named Station of the Year in the 2012 Frank Gillard Awards, also winning in the Sports Coverage category for its coverage of Olympic rowing at Eton Dorney. Andrew Peach won silver in both the Programme Presenter and The Ultimate Hot Seat categories.

In the 2013 Sony Radio Academy Awards the Andrew Peach programme won bronze in the category Breakfast Show of the Year (under 10 million).

In November 2018, BBC Radio Berkshire moved from Caversham Park House – which the station shared with BBC Monitoring – to new purpose-built studios at Thames Valley Park on the outskirts of Reading.

Transmitters
The Hannington transmitter for BBC Radio Berkshire's 104.1 FM frequency is located on Cottington Hill (close to Watership Down). Along with the BBC's signal it also carries television channels and Heart South on 102.9 FM. The 104.1 FM signal can be heard over most of Hampshire, certainly more than BBC Radio Solent. The Fountain House transmitter carries Heart South on 97 FM and BBC Radio Berkshire on 104.4 FM since 1991. The Henley-on-Thames transmitter which carries BBC Radio Berkshire on 94.6 FM also carries Heart South on 103.4 FM. The Windsor transmitter carries BBC Radio Berkshire on 95.4 FM.

Since 31 July 2004, DAB broadcasts have come from the NOW Digital Berkshire & North Hampshire 12D multiplex from Coppid Beech (at the junction of the B3408 and A329(M) in west Bracknell), Hannington and Hemdean (just north of Caversham). The Basingstoke DAB transmitter (between Cliddesden and Winslade near the A339 in Hampshire) was added on 3 October 2005.

Since June 2016, BBC Radio Berkshire has been available on Freeview TV channel 719. It also streams online via BBC Sounds.

Programming
Local programming is produced and broadcast from the BBC's Reading studios from 6am – 10pm on Sundays – Fridays and from 6am – 6pm and 8-10pm on Saturdays.

Off-peak programming, including the late show from 10pm – 1am, originates from BBC Radio Solent in Southampton.

During the station's downtime, BBC Radio Berkshire simulcasts overnight programming from BBC Radio 5 Live and BBC Radio London.

Presenters

Notable current presenters include:

Tony Blackburn (Sunday evenings)
Bill Buckley (weekday daytime)
Paul Coia (Sunday breakfast)
Kirsten O'Brien (Sunday daytime)
Andrew Peach (weekday breakfast)

References

External links 
 

Berkshire
Organisations based in Reading, Berkshire
Culture in Reading, Berkshire
Radio stations in Berkshire
Radio stations established in 1992